Michael Robert Neill (born April 27, 1970 in Martinsville, Virginia) is an American former Major League Baseball and Olympic baseball player.

Career 
His baseball career included a stint with the Oakland Athletics and ended with the Olympic Gold Medal team in the 2000 games in Sydney, Australia.  He was named Delaware Athlete of the Year in 2000.  At Villanova University he compiled a .417 career batting average, led the Wildcats to the 1989 and 1991 Big East Conference crowns and was named 1991 Big East Player of the Year. He established team records: 232 hits, 53 doubles and 379 total bases and several single season records.

Neill won two Minor League batting championships and had a .307 batting average over 11 years.  He was selected to 4 All-Star teams and was a key player in the Vancouver Canadians' 1999 AAA World Series victory.

He was called up by the Oakland Athletics in  but was sidelined with an injury. Neill led the 2000 USA Olympics team to a 4–0 win over Cuba in the gold medal game with a 1st-inning home run and a dramatic sliding catch in the 9th inning.  His walk off homer against Japan won the team's 1st round Olympic contest.  During the 1999 Pan American Games he had the game-winning hit to clinch the Olympic berth for his USA team.

See also
 1991 College Baseball All-America Team

References 

 Baseball Almanac
 

1970 births
Living people
All-American college baseball players
American expatriate baseball players in Canada
Baseball players at the 1999 Pan American Games
Baseball players from Virginia
Edmonton Trappers players
Huntsville Stars players
Modesto A's players
Medalists at the 2000 Summer Olympics
Oakland Athletics players
Olympic gold medalists for the United States in baseball
Pan American Games medalists in baseball
Pan American Games silver medalists for the United States
Pawtucket Red Sox players
People from Martinsville, Virginia
Reno Silver Sox players
Southern Oregon A's players
Tacoma Rainiers players
Tacoma Tigers players
Vancouver Canadians players
Villanova Wildcats baseball players
Baseball players at the 2000 Summer Olympics
Medalists at the 1999 Pan American Games